Enyang District is a district of the prefecture-level city of Bazhong in Sichuan province, China. It was created in January 2013 by splitting off 12 towns and 12 townships from Bazhou District. The seat of the district is at Enyang Town.

Administrative divisions
Enyang District is divided into 12 towns: 
Enyang (恩阳)
Yushan (玉山)
Chaba (茶坝)
Guanyinjing (观音井)
Huacong (花丛)
Liulin (柳林)
Xiabamiao (下八庙)
Yuxi (渔溪)
Qingmu (青木)
Sanhechang (三河场)
Sanhui (三汇)
Shangbamiao (上八庙)

and 12 townships: 
Shicheng (石城)
Xinglongchang (兴隆场)
Guangong (关公)
Sanxing (三星)
Wufeng (舞凤)
Shuangsheng (双胜)
Qunle (群乐)
Wan'an (万安)
Yinjia (尹家)
Jiuzhen (九镇)
Yujing (玉井)
Yixing (义兴)

References

Districts of Sichuan
2013 establishments in China
Populated places established in 2013
Bazhong